The following is a list of adhesive tapes with pressure-sensitive adhesives:

References

 
Adhesive Tape